The  was a Japanese department store located in Hamamatsu, Shizuoka, Japan. It was established in 1937 but by November 14, 2001, the store had accrued a 32.8 billion yen debt and went bankrupt.

In fiction
The department store is one of the main settings for the visual novel Planetarian: The Reverie of a Little Planet developed by Key.

References

Companies based in Shizuoka Prefecture
Department stores of Japan
Buildings and structures in Hamamatsu
Companies that have filed for bankruptcy in Japan
Retail companies established in 1937
Retail companies disestablished in 2001
Japanese companies established in 1937
Japanese companies disestablished in 2001
Defunct department stores